is a Japanese mecha anime television series produced by P.A. Works, directed by Tensai Okamura and written by Ryō Higaki, with character designs by Yuriko Ishii and music by Hiroaki Tsutsumi. The series was produced to celebrate P.A. Works' 15th anniversary. It follows a student of Tateyama International High School named Yukina Shirahane and a young samurai named Kennosuke Tokisada Ouma, who was born in the Sengoku period and reawakened in the present day inside a mysterious artifact called the Cube. When an extraterrestrial force called Efi Dorg invades Earth with a mission to collect all the fragments of an artifact called the Pivot Stone in order to achieve planet domination, Kennosuke pilots a stolen Efi Dorg mecha dubbed the Black Relic, with Yukina biometrically synchronized as the navigator due to an accident. Along with the help of the defense forces of the United Nations Kurobe Laboratory, the two fight back to prevent the mission of Efi Dorg from being accomplished. The series premiered on April 7, 2016 on Japanese TV channel AT-X while Netflix acquired exclusive rights for streaming worldwide.

Plot
450 years prior to the present, an extraterrestrial force called Efi Dorg invades Earth; the people of Sengoku era Japan dub their mecha and robotic drones as oni. They succeed in vanquishing their foes, but when the Black Relic is caught in an enemy explosion, Yukihime disappears.

60 years ago, the Black Relic is unearthed during the construction of the Kurobe Dam. In the present day, the United Nations Kurobe Laboratory is researching it when Efi Dorg returns. Yukina Shirahane, daughter of the United Nations Kurobe Laboratory director, accidentally reactivates the cockpit module of the Black Relic, releasing Kennosuke from cryostasis. Aided by Yukina's family and the United Nations Kurobe Laboratory in adjusting to life in the 21st century, he stands against Efi Dorg's invasion of Earth just as he did in his home era. As the Black Relic is the most effective weapon the United Nations Kurobe Laboratory has against Efi Dorg technology, Kennosuke becomes one of their most valuable assets. Due to an accident, Yukina is biometrically synchronized with the Black Relic, and as it requires a pilot and a navigator, Yukina thus becomes Kennosuke's combat partner.

Characters

Main characters

Kennosuke is a young man born in the Sengoku period and awoke in the present day from the "Cube", the control unit of the "Black Relic" found in the Kurobe Dam construction site. In order to protect Yukihime, he fought demons using a stolen alien robot he calls the Black Relic, a humanoid mecha controlled by two people, that only he can pilot and Yukina can navigate. He is the same age as Yukina and despite his initial confusion with the modern world, he befriends Yukina's family.

Yukina is a second-year high school student of Tateyama International High School, and her mother is the head of United Nations Kurobe Laboratory. She dreams of going to Mars. Because of the disappearance of her father, she feels insecure about her future and dislikes the idea of having to fight, especially if the enemy looks human. She is identical to Yukihime and later Muetta, causing Kennosuke much confusion.

 

Muetta is another Efi Dorg pilot who is a clone of Yukihime, grown using her DNA aboard an Efi Dorg ship according to Efi Dorg's attitude to create on-site its own troops by cloning conquered foes. Her geoframe is designated  by the UN. She is stabbed by Mirasa and barely survives. She eventually helps Kennosuke save Yukina from Efi Dorg.

Sophie is a French exchange student who is an Iaido-practicing samurai-otaku and a member of France's elite forces, the GIGN. Despite her petite frame, she’s a master of judo. Sophie is a prodigy with operating robots and is even a test pilot at the UN Kurobe Laboratory.

United Nations Kurobe Laboratory

Yukina’s mother and the Chief Researcher at the UN Kurobe Laboratory. She was lead designer of the currently under development “GAUS (Gravity Attenuated Upright Shell)”, units that are two-seater mecha operated by a pilot and navigator. She’s quite the overbearing mother type, but lacking in motherly qualities.

The 31-year old pilot of GAUS 1 and a member of the U.S. Marines. Though he has a rough personality, Tom is the combat leader of the GAUS pilots. During the counterattack against Efi Dorg he becomes the pilot of the Longarm.

The 27-year old navigator of GAUS 1. A very reserved person, Shenmei speaks little and helps to balance Tom's headstrong nature. She later becomes the pilot of GAUS 3.

The 38-year old navigator of GAUS 2. A captain in the JSDF, Sebastian is Sophie's butler. During Efi Dorg's largest assault, he sacrifices himself in an attempt to kill Mirasa and prevent her from attacking Muetta and Sophie, but despite being able to stop Mirasa, she manages to survive. It is later revealed that he also survived as well.

Chief Engineer at the UN Kurobe Laboratory. He is an expert on solid state physics and geology, and was in charge of excavating the artifact.

Commander of the defense forces at UN Kurobe Laboratory. A Major in the British Army and former member of SAS, Graham is earnest in his work and not just out for promotions.

Operator in the defense control room. Rita wears glasses and has a positive demeanor. After having been possessed by an electronic parasite, she cooperates with other controlled humans in activate the Pivot Stone; she's freed when the UN forces manage to retake the UN Kurobe Laboratory, but since the humans do not have the necessary technology to reverse the parasites' influence she remains in a vegetative state till 2021, when she seems return to herself much to the surprise of her friend Beth.

Operator in the defense control room. She’s big in height and heart.

A researcher in the development division at the UN Kurobe Laboratory. She has a PhD in material engineering and makes use of technology reverse-engineered from the Black Relic.

A researcher in the examination division at the UN Kurobe Laboratory. He has a PhD in electrical engineering and analyzes the Black Relic.

An expert on anatomy and biochemistry. He is bizarrely obsessed with his research subjects.

Tateyama International High School

A 23-year old school nurse and student counselor at Yukina’s high school. She is dedicated to the well-being of her charges.

Yukina’s homeroom teacher. Takekuma is a stick in the mud who does not mince words.

 Mika is Yukina’s classmate and childhood friend. A consistently upbeat person, her hobby is cosplay.

Yukina’s classmate who always carrying a camera around. He often tries to get into the heart of action, disregarding his own safety.

Yukina’s classmate who dislikes the chaos brought on by the arrival of Efi Dorg and the Black Relic. He is half Spanish and half Japanese, but he only speaks Japanese.

A classmate of Yukina with a reputation as a delinquent, who has a crush on Yukina. His father is head of maintenance at the UN Kurobe Laboratory.

Shirahane Family

 
Yukina’s father. He correctly deduced that the Ogres of legend were in fact extraterrestrial beings, but he mysteriously disappeared eight years ago. Zell revealed that they became friends and vowed to work together to stop Efi Dorg, but tragically he died in a snowstorm before Zell could help him.

Yukina’s younger sister and a third-year in elementary school. She lives with Yukina at their uncle’s temple. Koharu likes watching historical dramas on TV and looks up to Kennosuke.

 
Hiromi's older brother. He's a Buddhist monk and looks after his nieces while his sister is constantly at work.

Efi Dorg
 is an extraterrestrial organization which invaded Earth 450 years ago, and in the present day, its Gezon-Reco Company arrives to follow up on the scout force's progress. With the self-proclaimed mission of "civilizing the galaxy", Gezon-Reco Company's members call themselves "border reform officers". When asked by a UN official if Efi Dorg conquered, Fusunani considered it an acceptable description on the basis of reality operating on the principle of survival of the fittest, with the weak serving the strong.

The leader of Efi Dorg's Gezon-Reco Company. He's revealed to be a clone of the same species as Zell. He's stabbed and brainwashed by Zell into stopping the Kururu from activating, but informs that if the Kururu isn't stopped, a new, larger Gezon-Reco Company will arrive.

An ambitious Efi Dorg soldier who prioritizes personal achievement over the welfare of her comrades and Efi Dorg's combat principles. Her geoframe is designated  by the UN. She tries to kill Muetta to get the glory only for herself. During Efi Dorg's largest assault, she tries to finish Muetta, only for Sebastian to sacrifice himself to stop her. She's killed during the counterattack by Muetta.

An aggressive pilot of Efi Dorg. His geoframe is designated Bluebird by the UN. He is defeated by Kennosuke in the finale battle with help from Zell and Sophie, and is taken prisoner afterward. Muetta asks for his help in defeating Efi Dorg, but he calls her a traitor and turns her down, and it is unknown what happened to him after that.

A bald-headed pilot of Efi Dorg. His geoframe is designated Rockhead by the UN. During the counterattack Lefil combines his geoframe with his, but both are defeated by the teamwork of Kennosuke, Yukina, Sophie, Tom and Muetta and while Lefil manages to escape, he dies in the destruction of the geoframe.

The second seen Efi Dorg pilot. His geoframe is designated  by the UN. After being defeated by Kennosuke he is taken prisoner by the UN, but this is a ruse for him to escape custody in search of a Pivot Stone underneath the Kurobe Dam facility. Kennosuke realizes that he looks identical to a Washiba Clan samurai captain whom he once met, but when confronted, Fusnani denies any notion of being from Earth. After Fusunani is cornered by UN forces, he tries to kill Yukina to render the Black Relic useless, but he is then killed by Kennosuke. Like Muetta, he too is probably a clone created by the Washiba samurai's DNA to serve in the Efi Dorg invasion force.

The first seen Efi Dorg pilot. His geoframe is designated  by the UN. Kennosuke uses the Black Relic to defeat him once, severing Yellow Crab's right arm, but Hedo returns with a replacement arm for his mecha. After being defeated a second time, Hedo emerges from his mecha to acknowledge the prowess of the Black Relic's operator and to ask why they betrayed Efi Dorg. Receiving no answer due to Kennosuke's shock at his human appearance, Hedo proceeds to commit suicide by detonating Yellow Crab.

Other characters

The final heiress of the Washiba Clan. When Efi Dorg invaded Sengoku era Japan, Yukihime enlisted Kennosuke to operate the Black Relic with her to stand against the invaders. However, the Black Relic was eventually caught in an explosion, during which Yukihime died and Kennosuke lost his memory.

 / 

Zell is an alien from a planet located 220 light-years away from Earth in Chi-one Sagittarii, a binary star system in the zodiac constellation of Sagittarius. His species is red-skinned, horned, and has centuries-long lifespans. Zell's planet was conquered by the Efi Dorg, and he wanted to prevent Earth from facing the same fate. Arriving in Japan 450 years ago, he attempted to stop the Efi Dorg force which massacred the Washiba Clan, but the humans believed he was a demon and attacked him. In the recent past, Yukina's father Takehito Shirahane met him and attempted to assist his cause. Takehito also gave him the name Zell as a shortened form of his full name. In the present day, he has come to the aid of UN forces in order to counter Efi Dorg's invasion.

Media

Anime
Kuromukuro is directed by Tensai Okamura and produced by P.A. Works, spanning 26 episodes. It began airing on April 7, 2016. The series is written by Ryō Higaki, with character designs by Yuriko Ishii and music by Hiroaki Tsutsumi.

At the end of episodes 1 through 25, a short narration given by Yukina (except in episode 18, which Kennosuke narrates instead) about the featured mecha that appear in this series, including geoframes, artifacts, vehicles and infrastructures. General facts about each mecha are also presented for use of terminology.

Light novel
In 2018, a light novel sequel to the series called Kuromukuro: A Ghost at a Speed of 290,000 km per second was released on "P.A. Books, P.A. Works' e-book label. The novel picks up after the ending of the TV series and features the journey of Yukina and Sophie on board the Kurobe spaceship in search of Kennosuke. The author of the series is Ryo Higaki (one of the key writers on the TV series) and the illustrator is Yuriko Ishii (character designer for the TV series). The novel was serialised monthly from June 2018 to its conclusion in the seventh volume in November 2018.

References

External links

2016 anime television series debuts
Anime with original screenplays
AT-X (TV network) original programming
P.A.Works
Mecha anime and manga
Netflix original anime